Drosera sulphurea, the sulphur-flowered sundew, is a scrambling perennial tuberous species in the carnivorous plant genus Drosera. It is endemic to Western Australia and is found in coastal areas in sandy loam, often among Cephalotus. Yellow flowers bloom in September.

Drosera sulphurea was first described by Johann Georg Christian Lehmann in 1844. In 1864, George Bentham reduced the species to a variety of D. neesii. It was then further reduced to synonymy with D. neesii by N. G. Marchant in 1982. Then in 1999 Allen Lowrie, noticing that it was distantly related to D. subhirtella and its allied species, reinstated the species.

See also
List of Drosera species

References

Carnivorous plants of Australia
Caryophyllales of Australia
Eudicots of Western Australia
Plants described in 1844
sulphurea